"Hallo Spaceboy" is a song by David Bowie from his 1995 album Outside, and the third and final single from the album. The track was re-recorded in 1996 and issued as a remix featuring Pet Shop Boys as guest artists. Bowie and Brian Eno co-wrote the original album version of the song.

Song development
Written in early 1995, Bowie biographers Nicholas Pegg and Chris O'Leary point to the influence of the work of Brion Gysin on the song, who purportedly spoke the words "Moon dust will cover me" just before his death in 1986. Recording partner Reeves Gabrels recalled writing a song fragment called "Moondust" in mid-1994, which he thinks may have also influenced the song. Bowie wrote and recorded the song in mostly-improvised sessions with his band in 1995, and intentionally wrote it with a Nine Inch Nails-like vibe. Early work on the song was done with Brian Eno, Carlos Alomar, and drummer Joey Baron. After finishing the track, Bowie said "I adore that track. In my mind, it was like Jim Morrison meets industrial. When I heard it back, I thought, 'Fuck me. It's like metal Doors.' It's an extraordinary sound."

Single release and promotion
In late December 1995, Bowie was intending "Hallo Spaceboy" to be his next single after "Strangers When We Meet", and as such the song was performed twice in Birmingham, England: once as part of the regular set, and once as the final song of the show, with that last performance intended to be the official music video for the song. Concurrently, however, the Pet Shop Boys were approached to remix the song, and their remix was used as the official single version instead. The final official music video for "Hallo Spaceboy" was directed by David Mallet, mixing shots of both Bowie and the Pet Shop Boys into a rapid-fire montage of Cold War era retro-footage of science fiction film clips, atomic bomb testing footage, and television advertising clips. Neil Tennant explained that since the original song had only a single verse, band mate Chris Lowe suggested using lyrical fragments from Bowie's 1969 song "Space Oddity" to create a second verse. Bowie initially expressed reservation about the additions when Tennant initially told him during a telephone conversation, but later agreed that they worked well. For the single's release, alongside the Pet Shop Boys remix, two live tracks from the Birmingham show, "Moonage Daydream" and "Under Pressure", were included, but the live version of "Hallo Spaceboy" was never released until the entire show was made available as the live album No Trendy Réchauffé (Live Birmingham 95) in 2020.

Tennant told NME in a 1997 interview that he and Lowe, working alongside Bowie, had completed what Tennant called the "Major Tom trilogy", in reference to a fictional character who first appeared in Space Oddity and who had later recurred in Bowie's 1980 song "Ashes to Ashes".  Tennant explained, "I said to David Bowie, 'It's like Major Tom is in one of those Russian spaceships they can’t afford to bring down,' and he [Bowie] said, 'Oh wow, is that where he is?'"

Critical reception
British magazine Music Week rated the song four out of five, adding, "Overhauled with a Pet Shop Boys production/remix with extra vocals by Neil Tennant, this Outsider track has been transformed into a hi-NRG anthem with chart appeal to the max."

Live performances
In late 1995, Bowie performed this song together with Nine Inch Nails during Bowie's Outside Tour. In December 1995, Bowie performed the song twice at a concert in Birmingham, both of which appear on the live album No Trendy Réchauffé (Live Birmingham 95) (2020); he and the band also performed the song live on Jools Holland's 'Later' (Series 6) that same month. In February 1996, Bowie performed the song with Pet Shop Boys at the 1996 Brit Awards. A version recorded in July 1996 at the Phoenix Festival in England was released on the various artist compilation Phoenix: The Album in 1997. Played regularly during the Earthling Tour in 1997, a July 1997 recording was released on the live album Look at the Moon! in 2021, and a November 1997 recording from the same tour appeared on the live album LiveAndWell.com in 2000 (re-released in 2021). The Pet Shop Boys performed their version of the song live with Sylvia Mason-James singing Bowie's parts, released on the DVD Somewhere – Live at the Savoy (1997). At Bowie's 50th Birthday Bash in New York January 1997, the song was performed together with Foo Fighters. This performance featured Zachary Alford, William Goldsmith and Dave Grohl on three different drum sets and Nate Mendel and Gail Ann Dorsey on two bass guitars simultaneously. Bowie's 25 June 2000 performance of the song at the Glastonbury Festival was released in 2018 on Glastonbury 2000. Bowie performed the song live at BBC Radio Theatre, London, on 27 June 2000, and a recording of this performance was included on the bonus disc accompanying the first releases of Bowie at the Beeb in 2000. A November 2003 live performance from the A Reality Tour is included on the A Reality Tour DVD, released in 2004, as well as the A Reality Tour album, released in 2010.

Other releases 
The Pet Shop Boys remix was released as an additional track on Outside – version 2 and is included on some editions of the compilation albums Best of Bowie (2002), Nothing Has Changed (2014), and Bowie Legacy (2016). Several of the remixes, mostly from the 12" promo singles, were released on the 2004 limited 2CD edition of Outside. The extended Pet Shop Boys remix of "Hallo Spaceboy" is included on the Pet Shop Boys album Disco 4, released on 8 October 2007.

Remixes

Ball and Vauk
The three remixes by Dave Ball (known as the instrumentalist of Soft Cell) and Ingo Vauk are based on the Pet Shop Boys Remix, but only Double Click Mix uses Neil Tennant's vocals. Instrumental is an instrumental version of Double Click Mix.  Except the single mix, all remixes were initially released only on promo 12" singles. In 2004 they were included on the bonus disc of the re-released Outside album.

Track listing 
 All tracks by Bowie/Eno unless noted.
All live tracks were recorded 13 December 1995 in Birmingham, England during the Outside Tour.

CD: BMG-Arista / 74321 35383 2 Europe 

 "Hallo Spaceboy (Pet Shop Boys remix)" – 4:25
 "Under Pressure (live)" (Mercury, Deacon, Taylor, May, Bowie) – 4:07

 released in a card sleeve

CD: RCA-BMG 74321 35384 2 United Kingdom 
 "Hallo Spaceboy" (Pet Shop Boys remix) – 4:25
 "Under Pressure" (live) (Mercury, Deacon, Taylor, May, Bowie) – 4:07
 "Moonage Daydream" (live) (Bowie) – 5:25
 "The Hearts Filthy Lesson" (Radio Edit) (Bowie, Eno, Gabrels, Kızılçay, Campbell) – 4:56

CD: BMG-Arista / 74321 35382 2 Europe 
 "Hallo Spaceboy" (Pet Shop Boys remix) – 4:25
 "Under Pressure" (live) (Mercury, Deacon, Taylor, May, Bowie) – 4:07
 "Moonage Daydream" (live) (Bowie) – 5:25
 "The Hearts Filthy Lesson" (Bowie Mix) (Bowie, Eno, Gabrels, Kızılçay, Campbell) – 4:56

CD: BMG-Arista / BVCA-8820 Japan 
 "Hallo Spaceboy" (Pet Shop Boys remix) – 4:25
 "Under Pressure" (live) (Mercury, Deacon, Taylor, May, Bowie) – 4:07
 "Moonage Daydream" (live) (Bowie) – 5:25
 "The Hearts Filthy Lesson" (Rubber Mix) (Bowie, Eno, Gabrels, Kızılçay, Campbell) – 4:56

UK 7" version 
 "Hallo Spaceboy (Pet Shop Boys remix)" – 4:25
 "The Hearts Filthy Lesson (Radio edit)" (Bowie, Eno, Gabrels, Kızılçay, Campbell) – 3:33

12": BMG-Arista / SPACE 2 Europe 
 "Hallo Spaceboy" (12" remix) – 6:34

12": BMG / SPACE 3 United Kingdom 
 "Hallo Spaceboy" (Double Click mix) – 7:47
 "Hallo Spaceboy" (Instrumental) – 7:41
 "Hallo Spaceboy" (Lost in Space mix) – 6:29

12": Virgin / SPRO-11513 United States 
 "Hallo Spaceboy" (12" remix) – 6:45
 "Hallo Spaceboy" (Pet Shop Boys remix) – 4:25
 "Hallo Spaceboy" (Double Click mix) – 7:47
 "Hallo Spaceboy" (Lost in Space mix) – 6:29
 US promo

Personnel 
 Producers:
 David Bowie
 Brian Eno
 David Richards
 Musicians (original album version):
David Bowie: lead and backing vocals, saxophone
Brian Eno: synthesizers, drum machine
Reeves Gabrels: lead guitar
Carlos Alomar: rhythm guitar
Erdal Kızılçay: bass
Mike Garson: piano
Sterling Campbell: drums
 Musicians (Pet Shop Boys remix):
David Bowie: lead and backing vocals
Neil Tennant: lead and backing vocals
Chris Lowe: synthesizers, programming

Charts

References 

1996 singles
1995 songs
David Bowie songs
Pet Shop Boys songs
Songs written by David Bowie
Songs written by Brian Eno
Song recordings produced by Brian Eno
Song recordings produced by David Bowie
Arista Records singles
LGBT-related songs
Major Tom
Music videos directed by David Mallet (director)
Number-one singles in Israel